The Oxford Martyrs were Protestants tried for heresy in 1555 and burnt at the stake in Oxford, England, for their religious beliefs and teachings, during the Marian persecution in England.

The three martyrs were the Church of England bishops Hugh Latimer, Nicholas Ridley and Thomas Cranmer, the Archbishop of Canterbury.

History

The three were tried at University Church of St Mary the Virgin, the official church of the University of Oxford on the High Street, Oxford. The men were imprisoned at the former Bocardo Prison near the extant St Michael at the North Gate church (at the north gate of the city walls) in Cornmarket Street. The door of their cell is on display in the tower of the church.

The men were burnt at the stake just outside the city walls to the north, where Broad Street is now located. Latimer and Ridley were burnt on 16 October 1555 for denying the real presence of Christ in the Eucharist. Cranmer was burnt five months later on 21 March 1556.

A small area paved with granite setts forming a cross in the centre of the road outside the front of Balliol College marks the site. The Victorian spire-like Martyrs' Memorial, at the south end of St Giles' nearby, commemorates the events.

In literature
Lydia Sigourney's poem  was published in her 1827 collection of poetry.

Gallery

See also 
 Christian martyrs
 James Brooks, one of the papal sub-delegates in the Royal Commission for the trial
 List of Protestant martyrs of the English Reformation
 Martyrs' Memorial, Oxford
 Oxford Movement
 Religion in the United Kingdom

External links
 The Oxford Guide information
 The Oxford Martyrs article
 The martyrs' cross, Broad Street, Oxford

1555 in England
1556 in England
Groups of Anglican saints
History of Oxford
Christianity in Oxford
16th-century Christian saints
16th-century Protestant martyrs
1555 deaths
People executed under Mary I of England
Martyred groups
Executed British people
People executed for heresy
16th-century English people
People executed by the Kingdom of England by burning
Executed English people
Protestant martyrs of England